Nunchía is a town and municipality in the Department of Casanare, Colombia.

Born in Nunchía 
 Salvador Camacho, former president of Colombia

Municipalities of Casanare Department